The On Stage Together Tour was a concert tour by English musician Sting and American musician Paul Simon. The tour began on 8 February 2014 in Houston, Texas and traveled across North America, Oceania, and Europe before concluding on 18 April 2015 in Amsterdam, Netherlands.

Background 
Sting and Paul Simon became friends in late 1980s when they both lived in the same apartment building on the Upper West Side of Manhattan in New York City. In May 2013, they performed together for the first time at the annual Robin Hood Foundation benefit. "We were booked separately and then we said, 'Let's do it together.' So we did 'The Boxer' and 'Fields of Gold,' and there was an audible gasp in the room when we walked on together, and when we started singing we obeyed the basic rules of harmony, and it was great," said Sting in an interview with Billboard magazine. An idea for a joint concert tour originated after that performance. "After we finished it, we both looked at each other and said: 'Wow. That's pretty interesting,'" recalled Simon.

Separately from the ongoing Australian leg of the tour, Sting performed with Australian singer, musician and his long-time backing vocalist Jo Lawry on 5 February 2015 at the Bennetts Lane Jazz Club, Melbourne, singing as a duet the song "Impossible" from Lawry's new album Taking Pictures.

Set list 
This set list is representative of the show on 8 February 2014. It does not represent all concerts for the duration of the tour.

 "Brand New Day"
 "The Boy in the Bubble"
 "Fields of Gold"
 "Every Little Thing She Does Is Magic"
 "Englishman in New York"
 "I Hung My Head"
 "Driven to Tears"
 "Love Is the Seventh Wave"
 "Mother and Child Reunion"
 "Crazy Love"
 "Dazzling Blue"
 "50 Ways to Leave Your Lover"
 "Me and Julio Down by the Schoolyard"
 "That Was Your Mother"
 "Fragile"
 "America"
 "Message in a Bottle"
 "The Hounds of Winter"
 "They Dance Alone"
 "Roxanne"
 "Desert Rose"
 "The Boxer"
 "The Obvious Child"
 "Hearts and Bones" / "Mystery Train" / "Wheels"
 "Kodachrome" / "Gone At Last"
 "Diamonds on the Soles of Her Shoes"
 "You Can Call Me Al"
 "Every Breath You Take"
 "Late in the Evening"
 "Bridge Over Troubled Water"

Tour dates

References

External links 

Sting and Paul Simon Share 'On Stage Together' Tour Secrets: Exclusive. Rolling Stone

2014 concert tours
2015 concert tours
Sting (musician) concert tours
Paul Simon
Co-headlining concert tours